Lochmaeocles sparsus is a species of beetle in the family Cerambycidae. It was described by Henry Walter Bates in 1880. It is known from Nicaragua, Honduras, Mexico, Costa Rica, and Panama.

References

sparsus
Beetles described in 1880